Goera calcarata is a species of caddisfly in the family Goeridae. It is found in North America.

References

Integripalpia
Articles created by Qbugbot
Insects described in 1899